Alexander Romanovich Drenteln (Александр Романович Дрентельн) (1820-1888) was a Russian general.

He held the rank of General of the Infantry, and held the positions of:
 Adjutant General of the H. I. M. Retinue, 
 Chief of Gendarmes,
 the last Executive Head of the Third Section of His Imperial Majesty's Chancellery (1878-1880),
 Commander of the Odessa Military District (1880-1881).

On March 25, 1879, he was the target of a failed assassination attempt by Russian nihilists.

Awards
Order of Saint Stanislaus (House of Romanov), 1st class, 1863
Order of Saint Anna, 1st class, 1868

References 

1820 births
1888 deaths
Military personnel from Kyiv
Chiefs of the Special Corps of Gendarmes
Russian people of the January Uprising
Imperial Russian Army generals
Members of the State Council (Russian Empire)
Governors-General of Kiev
Recipients of the Order of Saint Stanislaus (Russian), 1st class
Recipients of the Order of St. Anna, 1st class
Russian untitled nobility